Wellington Lima may refer to:

 Wellington Lima (acrobat) (born 1979), Brazilian artistic acrobat
 Wellington Lima (footballer) (born 1990), Brazilian footballer